Aadyathe Anuraagam is a 1983 Indian Malayalam film, directed by V. S. Nair and produced by M. A. Sherif. The film stars Prem Nazir, Sukumari, Adoor Bhasi and Ambika. The musical score is by Raveendran.

Cast
Prem Nazir as Suresh
Sukumari as Syamala's mother
Adoor Bhasi as Janardhanan Pilla/Suresh's father
Ambika as Syamala
M. G. Soman as Jayan
Ramu as Rajasekharan Thampi
Reena as Sushamma
Kundara Johnny as Rasheed
Baby Shalini as Rajumon
Adam Ayub as Madanan

Soundtrack
The music was composed by Raveendran and the lyrics were written by Madhu Alappuzha and Devadas.

References

External links
 

1983 films
1980s Malayalam-language films